NASCAR teams compete in all three national NASCAR series: the Cup Series, Xfinity Series, and Craftsman Truck Series, as well as in all the regional touring series. A team is limited to four cars in each of the NASCAR series. The team often shares a single manufacturer for all of the team's cars, but each car has an independent car number, driver, and crew chief.

NASCAR Cup Series
All teams updated for the 2023 season

Teams and drivers

Full time

Part time

NASCAR Xfinity Series
All teams updated for the 2023 season

Teams and drivers

Full time

Part-time

Notes

NASCAR Craftsman Truck Series
All teams updated for the 2023 season

Teams and drivers

Full time

Part time

Notes

References

External links
MotorsportsOne.com
Jayski.com
NASCAR.com

Teams